is a Japanese voice actress and singer affiliated with Amuleto (formerly Arts Vision and I'm Enterprise). She debuted as a voice actress in 1997, releasing her debut single "Yūki o Kudasai" on March 26, 1997. Her role as Nanoha Takamachi in the Magical Girl Lyrical Nanoha series contributed to a rise in her popularity, as several of her singles ("Little Wish: Lyrical Step", "Spiritual Garden", "Hoshizora no Spica", "Beautiful Amulet") were used as the ending themes for the franchise's anime adaptations. Besides Nanoha, she voices the title characters Haruka Minazuki / Red Angel in Kaitō Tenshi Twin Angel, Ringo Kinoshita in No-Rin, Yamada in B Gata H Kei and Kaoru Tsunashi in I Can't Understand What My Husband Is Saying. Other major voice roles in anime include Ruru/Ruru Amour/Cure Amour in Hugtto! PreCure, Elizabeth Midford in Black Butler,  Jibril in No Game No Life, Finis in Lost Song Michiru in Air, Kanako Kurusu in Oreimo, Suzuha Amane in Steins;Gate, Mai Kawasumi in Kanon, Mei Sunohara in Clannad and Saku Tōyama in Tantei Opera Milky Holmes, Rika Furude in Higurashi When They Cry and Tenten in Naruto. In video games, besides the ones that were adapted into anime, she voices Talim in Soulcalibur, Saya in Blue Archive, Qiqi and Nahida in Genshin Impact, Bounce Man in Mega Man 11, Theresa Apocalypse in Honkai Impact 3rd, Remilia Scarlet in Touhou Cannonball, Io in Granblue Fantasy, Gnar in League of Legends, Bernkastel in Umineko When They Cry, Nand Myao in Marl Kingdom and M4 SOPMOD II in Girls' Frontline.

Biography
Born in Fukuoka Prefecture, Tamura gained fame as an advocate for the Lolita fashion movement, wearing Lolita-style clothing in public, as well as for her music releases, often in music videos and on the covers of her CD releases. Affectionately called Yukarin by her fans, several of her releases have been used as opening and ending themes for anime series, while some have reached the Oricon top 100 singles and album charts. In 2001, Tamura formed a unit called Yamato Nadeshiko alongside Yui Horie. Two singles were released, Mō Hitori no Watashi and Merry Merrily - the latter of which was an insert song in the Love Hina Christmas Special.

On January 1, 2007, Tamura's talent management agency changed from Arts Vision to I'm Enterprise, a subsidiary of Arts Vision and on April 1, 2007, Tamura's record company officially changed from Konami to King Records, however, there was no material effect to Tamura because the actual record production of Konami is carried out by King Records. She has also featured as a narrator of Japanese anime satellite television network Animax.

In February 2016, Tamura's agency announced that a concert which had been announced during a Niconico livestream in 2015 would be cancelled. Her management also announced that her fanclub would change ownership and her radio programs would end. Her staff's Twitter account would be closed and her website would undergo maintenance. On February 13, 2016, her management announced that her contract with King Records would end on March 20, 2016. She changed her agency once more from I'm Enterprise to Amuleto.

Filmography

Anime

Film

Drama CD

Video games

Tokusatsu

Dubbing roles
 Piranha 3D – Zane Forester (Sage Ryan)
 Spin City – Karen Palmieri (Taylor Stanley)
 Yellowjackets – Misty (Christina Ricci)

Discography

Studio albums
 1997: What's New, Pussycat?
 2001: Tenshi wa Hitomi no Naka ni
 2002: Hana-furi Tsukiyo to Koi-youbi.
 2003: Aozora ni Yureru Mitsugetsu no Kobune.
 2005: Kohaku no Uta, Hitohira
 2006: Gin no Senritsu, Kioku no Mizuoto.
 2008: Izayoi no Tsuki, Canaria no Koi.
 2009: Komorebi no Rosette
 2010: Citron no Ame
 2011: Haru Machi Soleil
 2013: Rasen no Kajitsu
 2020: Candy tuft
 2021: Ai Kotoba

Mini albums
 2013: Hatsukoi (nominally by Yuka Kagurazaka)
 2014: Doki Doki ☆ π Pine (nominally by Yuka Kagurazaka)
 2015: Hito Natsu no Himitsu (nominally by Yuka Kagurazaka)
 2017: Princess Limited

Compilation albums
 2003: True Romance
 2007: Sincerely Dears...
 2012: Everlasting Gift
 2015: Early Years Collection

DVDs
 2002: Sweet chick girl
 2004: Peachy Cherry Pie
 2004: Yukari Tamura Summer Live 2004 - Sugar Time Trip
 2006: Cutie Cutie Concert 2005 at Tokyo International Forum
 2007: Yukari Tamura Live 2006-2007 Pinkle Twinkle☆Milky Way
 2008: Love Live: Chelsea Girl

Blu-ray discs and DVDs
 2009: LOVE ♡ LIVE *Dreamy Maple Crown*
 2010: LOVE ♡ LIVE *Princess à la mode*
 2011: LOVE ♡ LIVE *Mary Rose* & *Starry☆Candy☆Stripe*
 2012: LOVE ♡ LIVE *I Love Rabbit*
 2013: LOVE ♡ LIVE *Fall in Love*
 2013: 17sai dayo?! Yukari-chan Matsuri!!
 2014: LOVE ♡ LIVE *Cute'n ♡ Cute'n Heart*
 2014: LOVE ♡ LIVE *Fruits Fruits ♡ Cherry* & *Caramel Ribbon*
 2015: LOVE ♡ LIVE *Lantana in the Moonlight*

Singles
 1997: "Yūki wo Kudasai"
 1997: "We Can Fly" (duet with Yuria Hama)
 1997: "Kagayaki no Kisetsu"
 1998: "Rebirth: Megami Tensei"
 1999: "Kitto Ieru"
 2001: "Summer Melody"
 2002: "Love Parade"
 2002: "Baby's Breath"
 2003: "Lovely Magic"
 2003: "Nemurenu Yoru ni Tsukamaete"
 2003: "My Life is Great"
 2004: "Yumemizuki no Alice"
 2004: "Sugar time trip"
 2004: "Little Wish ~lyrical step~"
 2005: "Koi seyo Onnanoko"
 2005: "Picnic"
 2005: "Spiritual Garden"
 2006: "Dōwa Meikyū"
 2006: "Princess Rose"
 2007: "Hoshizora no Spica"
 2007: 
 2007: "Beautiful Amulet"
 2008: "S·A·G·A ~Rinne no Hate ni~"
 2008: "Mon chéri"
 2008: "Bambino Bambina"
 2008: "Tomorrow"
 2009: "Metausa-hime: Kuro Yukari Ōkoku Misa"
 2009: "You & Me"
 2010: "My Wish My Love"
 2010: "Oshiete A to Z"
 2011: "Platinum Lover's Day"
 2011: "Merōn Ondo: Festival of Kingdom"
 2011: "Endless Story"
 2012: "Hohoemi no Plumage"
 2013: "W:Wonder Tale"
 2013: "Fantastic future"
 2014: "Himitsu no door kara ai ni kite"
 2014: "Anone Love me Do"
 2015: "Sukidatte ienakute"
 2018: "Koi wa Tenshi no Chime kara"
 2018: "Eien no Hitotsu"
 2018: "Tears Echo"
 2020: "Catch you Cats Me"
 2021: "Pink Pygmalion"
 2021: "Que SeraSera"

Concerts

Personal concerts
 2003: *First Live -Aozora ni Yureru Mitsugetsu no Kobune.-*
 2004: Summer Live☆2004 *Sugar Time Trip*
 2004-2005: Countdown Event 2004-2005 *Chiisa na Onegai☆Chiisa na Ippo*
 2005: Live Tour 2005 *Spring fever*
 2005: *Cutie♡Cutie Concert* 2005
 2006: Concert Tour 2006 *fancy baby doll*
 2006: *Pinkle☆Twinkle Party* 2006 Winter
 2007: 2007 Summer *Sweet Milky Way*
 2008: LOVE ♡ LIVE 2008 *Chelsea Girl*
 2009: LOVE ♡ LIVE 2009 *Dreamy Maple Crown*
 2009-2010: LOVE ♡ LIVE 2009-2010 *Princess à la mode*
 2010: LOVE ♡ LIVE 2010 *STARRY☆CANDY☆STRIPE*
 2011: LOVE ♡ LIVE 2011 Spring *Mary Rose*
 2012: LOVE ♡ LIVE 2012 *I Love Rabbit*
 2012: LOVE ♡ LIVE 2012 Autumn *Fall in Love*
 2013: LOVE ♡ LIVE 2013 *Cute'n ♡ Cute'n Heart*
 2013: LOVE ♡ LIVE 2013 Autumn *Caramel Ribbon*
 2014: LOVE ♡ LIVE 2014 Spring *Fruits Fruits ♡ Cherry*
 2015: LOVE ♡ LIVE 2015 Winter *Lantana in the Moonlight*
 2015: LOVE ♡ LIVE 2015 Spring *Sunny side Lily*
 2017: 20th Anniversary LOVE ♡ LIVE 2017 *Crescendo ♡ Carol*

Other concerts
 Animelo Summer Live 2008
 Animelo Summer Live 2009
 Animelo Summer Live 2010
 Animelo Summer Live 2011
 Animelo Summer Live 2012
 Animelo Summer Live 2013
 Animelo Summer Live 2014
 King Super Live 2015
 Animelo Summer Live 2017

Publications
 Sora Iro
 Released October 10, 2007
 Yukaringo
 Released February 23, 2011
 Yukarissimo
 Released September 20, 2012
 Yukari-Remix
 Released July 14, 2015

References

Sources

External links
  
  
 
 YouTube channel
 Official agency profile 
 Official music profile at King Records 
 Yukari Tamura at Oricon 
 Yukari Tamura  at Ryu's Seiyuu database
 
 
 

Living people
Anime singers
Animax
Arts Vision voice actors
I'm Enterprise voice actors
Japanese women pop singers
Japanese idols
Japanese video game actresses
Japanese voice actresses
King Records (Japan) artists
Music YouTubers
Musicians from Fukuoka Prefecture
Voice actresses from Fukuoka Prefecture
20th-century Japanese actresses
21st-century Japanese actresses
20th-century Japanese women singers
20th-century Japanese singers
21st-century Japanese women singers
21st-century Japanese singers
Japanese YouTubers
Sega people
1976 births